The Vicious Circle (Swedish: Den onda cirkeln) is a 1967 Swedish drama film directed by Arne Mattsson and starring Gunnel Lindblom, Erik Hell and Gio Petré. It was shot at the Råsunda Studios in Stockholm. The film's sets were designed by the art director P.A. Lundgren.

Cast
 Gunnel Lindblom as 	Maria
 Erik Hell as The Father
 Gio Petré as 	Inger
 Mathias Henrikson as 	Sten
 Marie-Louise Håkansson as 	Eva
 Heinz Hopf as Man on Beach

References

Bibliography 
 Björklund, Elisabet & Larsson, Mariah. Swedish Cinema and the Sexual Revolution: Critical Essays. McFarland, 2016.
 Qvist, Per Olov & von Bagh, Peter. Guide to the Cinema of Sweden and Finland. Greenwood Publishing Group, 2000.

External links 
 

1967 films
Swedish drama films
1967 drama films
1960s Swedish-language films
Films directed by Arne Mattsson
1960s Swedish films